Egil Sundar (né Nilsen; 17 October 1932 – 20 April 1994) was a Norwegian journalist and newspaper editor. He was born in Oslo. He was editor-in-chief of the newspaper Aftenposten from 1984 to 1990. From 1990 he worked for the Norwegian Broadcasting Corporation.

References

1932 births
1994 deaths
Writers from Oslo
Norwegian newspaper editors
20th-century Norwegian writers
Aftenposten editors